Antillophos grateloupianus is a species of sea snail, a marine gastropod mollusc in the family Nassariidae, the true whelks and the like.

Description

Distribution
This species occurs in the Atlantic Ocean off Senegal.

References

 Petit de la Saussaye S. (1853). Notice sur le genre Phos de Denys de Montfort, avec la description de deux espèces nouvelles. Journal de Conchyliologie. 3: 235–245, pl. 8.
 Gofas, S.; Afonso, J.P.; Brandào, M. (Ed.). (S.a.). Conchas e Moluscos de Angola = Coquillages et Mollusques d'Angola. [Shells and molluscs of Angola]. Universidade Agostinho / Elf Aquitaine Angola: Angola. 140 pp.
 Bernard, P.A. (Ed.) (1984). Coquillages du Gabon [Shells of Gabon]. Pierre A. Bernard: Libreville, Gabon. 140, 75 plates pp.

External links

Nassariidae
Gastropods described in 1853